Jama Masjid, Bhilai is one of the largest mosques in Chhattisgarh, India, with a capacity to accommodate more than 3000 worshippers at a time. It is the first mosque in the world to be built in the shape of the word "Ya Allah" in Arabic script. It took three years for the construction of the mosque which was completed in 1967.

History 
Before the construction of the mosque the Muslims of Bhilai used to pray in their respective localities and gathered only on Eid al-Fitr and Eid al-Adha to offer common prayer near Nehru house of Culture in sector-1, Bhilai.
The Muslim executives of Bhilai steel plant formed a committee and applied for its registration. It was registered as Bhilai Nagar Masjid Trust under Madhya Pradesh public Trust act 1951. The Bhilai steel plant allotted a plot measuring 12000 square feet in sector-6 to this committee for the Mosque. The construction began in 1964 and was completed in 1967. The first Friday prayer was held in the new mosque on 31 March 1967.

Architecture and design 
The special design of the mosque has created a history in the world of Islamic architecture through its monumental elevation which forms an Arabic word Yā Allāh (یا الله). The 80 feet high minar shapes ‘Ya’ while the concrete walls of the first floor with a slab above in the shape of tashdeed projects ‘Allah’. The marble dome at the top further enhances the beauty of this unique mosque in the world.

It was designed by the architect Khairuddin Ahmad Siddiqui, Siddiqui and associates, Hyderabad, Telangana.

The mosque is 59 feet high, including the 16 feet high dome, 120 feet long and 100 feet wide. The Eid-gah adjacent to the mosque is 250 feet long and 230 feet wide. Marble tiles have been fixed inside and outside of the mosque’s minar. 
The mosque is maintained by the founding committee Bhilai Nagar Masjid Trust.

Imams 
Alhaj Hafiz Sayed Ajmaluddin Haider served as the first Imam of this Mosque from 1968 to 2013. Born in Patna in 1942, his family moved permanently to Durg in 1952. His father, Maulana Afzaluddin Haidar became Imam of Jama Masjid Durg since 1952 whose mazaar is in Supela Kabristan, Bhilai. Alhaj Hafiz Sayed Ajmaluddin Haider is affiliated to Qadiriyyah Chishtiya Ashrafiya order of Sufism and is educated from Darul Uloom Islamia Nagpur.

Hafiz Iqbal Haider Anjum is the current Imam of the mosque who started serving from 1 January 2014. He is educated from Jame Ashraf, Kichaucha Shareef, Faizabad in Uttar Pradesh.

Welfare and development 
A Muslim community hall is built near mosque by the Bhilai Nagar masjid trust with the help of Muslims in Bhilai. The hall is 90 feet long, 42 feet wide and 22 feet high. A ladies’ hall has been partitioned out of it with approximately half of the total dimensions of the hall. The second floor is under construction and is estimated to be completed by the end of July 2015.

Representatives from non-Muslim communities - Sikh, Christian and Arya Samaj - visit every year to the mosque for wishing Muslims on the occasions of Eid conveying the spirit of inter-religious brotherhood and peace in Bhilai.

See also 
Bhilai
Islam in India
Islamic architecture
List of mosques in India

References

Religious buildings and structures in Chhattisgarh
Bhilai
Mosques completed in 1967
Buildings and structures in Bhilai
Bhilai